Tomás Girón Gutiérrez (born 5 March 1992) is a Spanish footballer who plays for CD Gerena as a left back.

Football career
Born in Seville, Andalusia, Girón graduated from local Sevilla FC after spells with neighbouring Real Betis and Real Madrid, and spent his first year as a senior with the B-team. In February 2012 he moved to another reserve team, Recreativo de Huelva B.

On 4 May 2014 Girón first appeared for the main squad, starting in a 0–0 away draw against CD Numancia in the Segunda División. On 13 August he left Recre and joined Segunda División B club CD Toledo.

References

External links

1992 births
Living people
Footballers from Seville
Spanish footballers
Association football defenders
Segunda División players
Segunda División B players
Tercera División players
Sevilla Atlético players
Atlético Onubense players
Recreativo de Huelva players
CD Toledo players
CD Gerena players
Spain youth international footballers